It Keeps Right On a-Hurtin' is an album by Johnny Tillotson. It was released to capitalize on the success of Tillotson's hit of the same name. Billy Joe Royal went to #17 on the Country Singles chart in 1988 with his version of "It Keeps Right On a-Hurtin'". The album was arranged by Archie Bleyer and had vocal accompaniment by The Anita Kerr Singers and The Jordanaires. Charlie McCoy plays the harmonica on four tracks.

Track listing

Side 1
 "It Keeps Right On a-Hurtin'" (Johnny Tillotson)
 "Lonely Street" (Carl Belew, Kenny Sowder, W.S. Stevenson)
 "I'm So Lonesome I Could Cry" (Hank Williams)
 "Funny How Time Slips Away" (Willie Nelson)
 "I Fall to Pieces" (Hank Cochran, Harlan Howard)
 "What'll I Do" (Irving Berlin)

Side 2
 "I Can't Help It (If I'm Still in Love with You)" (Hank Williams)
 "Take Good Care of Her" (Arthur Kent, Ed Warren)
 "Four Walls" (George Campbell, Marvin Moore)
 "Send Me the Pillow You Dream On" (Hank Locklin)
 "Fool #1" (Kathryn R. Fulton)
 "Hello Walls" (Willie Nelson)

Charts
Album - Billboard (United States)

Singles - Billboard (United States)

References

1962 albums
Johnny Tillotson albums
Cadence Records albums
Albums arranged by Archie Bleyer